The Dallara P217 is a sportscar prototype built by Dallara Automobili to the 2017 FIA/ACO regulations for the Le Mans Prototype LMP2 class. The car also meets the regulations for the Le Mans Prototype 2 Class of the IMSA WeatherTech Sportscar Championship. It was active in the FIA World Endurance Championship, and the European Le Mans Series. The prototype made its debut at the 2017 4 Hours of Silverstone.

Development 
The car is a result of the bid made by Dallara, for one of the four licenses to build the new for 2017 Le Mans Prototype 2 cars.  It is also the first LMP constructed by Dallara since the original Audi R18 TDI. The car was first spotted testing at the Autodromo Riccardo Paletti in Northern Italy in late early October, by the Italian magazine Autosprint. 

During the 2017 racing season, the car was discovered to have a fundamental issue with a critical element of the sprint kit which was firmly homologated and carried over in the Le Mans low-drag kit. Resulting in major balance issues for the car which first surfaced at Le Mans. With the car being noted for its speed on the long straights, such as the Mulsanne Straight, but also for its lack of pace in the twistier sections of the track. This element was later revealed to be the splitter. The car was subsequently fitted with an Evo kit for the 2018 racing season to resolve issues with the car. With a new splitter for the Standard High Downforce Aero package and a revised Le Mans Low Drag Kit. Ahead of the homologation of the Evo Package, the revised car was revealed to have undergone testing at the Algarve International Circuit, in the hands of customer team Cetilar Villorba Corse. The car has also been known for its relative similarity to the Porsche 919 Hybrid.

Cadillac DPi-V.R 

A Daytona Prototype International variant of the car, has been developed in partnership with General Motors (under its Cadillac marque), as well as Wayne Taylor Racing. It was unveiled on the 30th of November and is a successor to the successful Corvette Daytona Prototype that was fielded in the Grand-Am Rolex Sports Car Series, as well as the IMSA WeatherTech Sportscar Championship. It is powered by a LS based GM small-block engine, originally a 6.2L V8 designed, developed, and produced by ECR Engines, mated to a 6 Speed Xtrac transmission, producing 600 hp. In this guise, the car was extremely dominant, with the car winning on its debut at the 2017 Rolex 24 at Daytona, where Wayne Taylor Racing leading a 1-2 with Action Express Racing, while also winning 8 of the 10 races in the calendar. In 2018, the displacement of the LS engine was changed to 5.5L, again built by ECR Engines and producing 580 hp, following a series of BoP adjustments during 2017 to slow down the car the previous season, that had made the car hard to drive, with most notably a tall first and second gear mandated after the low-end torque became an advantage against the turbocharged four and six-cylinder engines.

Complete IMSA SportsCar Championship results 
Results in bold indicate pole position. Results in italics indicate fastest lap.

Complete FIA World Endurance Championship results 
Results in bold indicate pole position. Results in italics indicate fastest lap.

Complete European Le Mans Series results 
Results in bold indicate pole position. Results in italics indicate fastest lap.

See also 
 BR Engineering BR1 (Dallara-based LMP1 chassis)
 Cadillac DPi-V.R (Dallara-based DPi chassis)

References 

24 Hours of Le Mans race cars
Le Mans Prototypes
Sports prototypes
P217